"Obsession" is the thirteenth episode of the second season of the American science fiction television series Star Trek. Written by Art Wallace and directed by Ralph Senensky, it was originally broadcast on December 15, 1967.

In the episode, Captain Kirk becomes obsessed with destroying a deadly cloud-like entity that killed a crew he was on in the past.

Plot
During a planetary survey, three members of a landing party from the Federation starship USS Enterprise are attacked, their blood drained of hemoglobin. Fearing the killer to be a gaseous entity he had encountered eleven years before while serving aboard the USS Farragut, Kirk neglects a rendezvous with the USS Yorktown to hunt for the creature. While the Enterprise crew fails to find the creature using shipboard sensors, the creature attacks a second landing party, draining hemoglobin out of two more crew members. Back on the ship, when Kirk learns that security officer Garrovick hesitated to fire his phaser upon the creature, he relieves the ensign of his duties.

Chief Medical Officer Dr. McCoy, having reviewed the records of Kirk's previous encounter, confronts the captain over his obsession with the creature; as a young lieutenant, Kirk had hesitated in firing phasers at the creature, which subsequently killed half the Farragut crew. Though given a commendation for bravery, Kirk continues to blame himself for the deaths. Kirk maintains that the creature poses an urgent threat. Ensign Chekov interrupts to report that the cloud creature is moving away from the planet.

The Enterprise chases the creature until it turns around and advances on the ship. Kirk orders weapons to fire, which has no effect. The creature then passes through the shields and into the ventilation system. Spock points out to Kirk that, since the creature cannot be harmed with conventional weapons, the captain has nothing to regret about his earlier encounter. Determined to combat this illogical human guilt reaction, Spock is trying to convince Garrovick he did nothing wrong, when the creature emerges through a vent in Garrovick's room.  Spock, after forcing Garrovick to leave, tries to shut it out, and is enveloped, but his copper-based green blood repels it.  Realizing that neither he nor Garrovick could have harmed the creature, Kirk orders the ensign to return to duty.

The creature finally leaves the ship. Believing it to be heading to the Tycho system to spawn, Kirk and Garrovick beam down with an antimatter bomb. With the creature about to envelop them, Kirk and Garrovick beam away and the bomb explodes, annihilating the entity.

Production
The writer, Art Wallace, noted that he based the story on Moby Dick and series writer D.C. Fontana observed that it had similarities with the earlier episode, "The Doomsday Machine".

When director Ralph Senensky left to observe the Jewish holiday of Yom Kippur, producer John Meredyth Lucas took his place for a few hours, making this his directorial debut for the series. Later Lucas directed "The Ultimate Computer", "Elaan of Troyius", and "The Enterprise Incident".

"Lieutenant Lesley" played by regular Star Trek background actor Eddie Paskey is killed in this episode, however his character re-appears (and is referred to by name) in many subsequent episodes. Paskey was one of the core group of regular Star Trek extras and appeared in almost every episode, including the second pilot Where No Man Has Gone Before, until he left the show in the middle of the third season.

Reception

Zack Handlen of  The A.V. Club gave the episode a "B" rating saying that Garrovick isn't important to the viewers because this is the only episode we see him in, and that Kirk's "obsession" is a nice flaw to see in an otherwise too-perfect character.

In 2014, Gizmodo ranked "Obsession" as the 43rd best episode of Star Trek, out of the over 700 ones made by that time. They note it shows the dangers of an out-of-control captain, and that Kirk has become obsessed with getting revenge in this episode.

In 2009, GameRadar+ noted this episode for the deaths of crewmen during the away mission to the planet's surface.

In 2019, Nerdist included this episode on their "Best of Kirk" binge-watching guide.

References

External links

"Obsession" Remastered Screen Shots at TrekMovie.com

Star Trek: The Original Series (season 2) episodes
1967 American television episodes
Television episodes about vampires
Films scored by Sol Kaplan
Television episodes directed by Ralph Senensky